Nallakalam is a 1954 Indian Tamil-language film directed by K. Vembu and Jyotish Sinha. The film stars M. K. Radha and Pandari Bai.

Cast 
The list was compiled from the database of Film News Anandan and from Thiraikalanjiyam

Male cast
M. K. Radha
T. S. Balaiah
N. S. Krishnan
Kula Deivam V. R. Rajagopal
M. L. Pathy
T. S. Natarajan
Female Cast
Pandari Bai
T. A. Mathuram
K. Varalakshmi
K. Lakshmikantham

Production 
K. Prabhakar was in charge of Cinematography while the editing was done by C. Rajan. Choreography was by Sohanlal. Nallakalam was filmed at Film Centre, Madras and the stills were taken by Gnanam.

Soundtrack 
Music was composed by K. V. Mahadevan while the lyrics were penned by M. P. Sivam, Puratchidasan and Udumalai Narayana Kavi.

Reception 
The Indian Express called it an "above-average picture".

References

External links 

1950s Tamil-language films
1954 drama films
Films scored by K. V. Mahadevan
Indian drama films